Sweetwater Canal can mean:
The Sweet Water Canal in Egypt running eastwards from the Nile near Cairo to the south end of the Suez Canal
A canal near Basra in Iraq